The Swedish Army Signal School (SignS) was established in 1942 and had the task of training personnel from the Swedish Army Signal Troops in terms of staff and troop signal unit technology, training methodology and tactical use. The unit was amalgamated into the Swedish Army School of Staff Work and Communications in 1965.

History
In 1960, the Swedish School of Communication Security (Signalskyddskolan) was attached to the school. The school's tasks were to further train officers and technical personnel within the Swedish Army Signal Troops, to train other permanently employed officers and conscripts in military communications and in the maintenance and repair of signal equipment and to be responsible for communication security training for the Swedish Total Defence. The school ceased in 1965 and was reorganized into the Swedish Army School of Staff Work and Communications (Arméns stabs- och sambandsskola, StabSbS).

Commanding officers
1942–1945: Colonel 
1945–1953: Colonel 
1954–1963: Colonel 
1963–1965: Colonel Bertil Hedberg

References

Further reading

Military communications units and formations of the Swedish Army
Disbanded units and formations of Sweden
Military units and formations established in 1942
Military units and formations disestablished in 1965
1942 establishments in Sweden
1965 disestablishments in Sweden